Béla Turi-Kovács (born 2 December 1935) is a Hungarian politician, who served as Minister of Environment between 2000 and 2002. He is a member of the National Assembly since 1998. He is the Father of the House (oldest sitting MP) since 2014 thus he opened the inaugural sessions of the National Assembly in 2014, 2018 and 2022.

In 1956 he was a member of the Independent Smallholders, Agrarian Workers and Civic Party.

References

1935 births
Living people
Hungarian jurists
Eötvös Loránd University alumni
People of the Hungarian Revolution of 1956
Independent Smallholders, Agrarian Workers and Civic Party politicians
Hungarian Democratic Forum politicians
Fidesz politicians
Government ministers of Hungary
Members of the National Assembly of Hungary (1998–2002)
Members of the National Assembly of Hungary (2002–2006)
Members of the National Assembly of Hungary (2006–2010)
Members of the National Assembly of Hungary (2010–2014)
Members of the National Assembly of Hungary (2014–2018)
Members of the National Assembly of Hungary (2018–2022)
Members of the National Assembly of Hungary (2022–2026)
People from Békés County